The 2015–16 Prva A Liga, known as Erste košarkaške lige by sponsorship reasons, was the 10th season of the Montenegrin Basketball League, the top tier basketball league on Montenegro. The season started on November 6, 2015. Budućnost VOLI is the defending champion.

Competition format
Nine of the eleven teams that play the league join the regular season and play a three-round robin competition where the six first qualified teams join the playoffs with the two 2015–16 ABA League teams (Budućnost Voli and Sutjeska). The last qualified team is relegated.

Regular season

Playoffs

References

Prva A liga seasons
Montenegro
Prva A liga